Statistics of Austrian Football Bundesliga in the 1981–82 season.

Overview
It was contested by 10 teams, and SK Rapid Wien won the championship.

Teams and location

Teams of 1981–82 Austrian Football Bundesliga
FC Admira/Wacker
Austria Salzburg
Austria Wien
Grazer AK
LASK
Rapid Wien
Sturm Graz
VÖEST Linz
Wacker Innsbruck
Wiener Sport-Club

League standings

Results
Teams played each other four times in the league. In the first half of the season each team played every other team twice (home and away), and then did the same in the second half of the season.

First half of season

Second half of season

References
Austria - List of final tables (RSSSF)

Austrian Football Bundesliga seasons
Austria
1981–82 in Austrian football